Ashland is an unincorporated community located in McDowell County, West Virginia, United States. Located on the headwaters of the North Fork of Elkhorn Creek, it is also the location of the national historic Ashland Company Store and the Ashland Trailhead for the Indian Ridge Trail, a part of the Hatfield McCoy Trail System. It is the birthplace of 1960s soul singer Garnet Mimms.

The Ashland Resort is located one mile above Ashland.

References 

Unincorporated communities in McDowell County, West Virginia
Unincorporated communities in West Virginia